Balghar is a village in Ghanche, Gilgit Baltistan, Pakistan on the banks of the Shyok River. The Shyok River meets the Indus River at Keris کریس, about 30 kilometers west of Balghar. Balghar includes 15 large and small neighbourhoods (mahallahs): Gond Balghar, Chan Gond Balghar, Chopya, Rotaka, Ongbo, Marmoung Balghar, Loda Balghar, Khanka Grwong Balghar, Khodakha Balghar, Gareippa Balghar, Krawathang Balghar, Khashu Balghar, Gamba Bordas Balghar, Yompowa Balghar, and Xooq Balghar. House Valley is to the east, Karis Valley to the west, Shiger Valley to the north, and Daghoni/Balghar are located to the south.

Balghar valley is 50 kilometers northwest of the district headquarters of Ghanche, and 110 kilometers from Skardu city. Balghar valley is at an elevation of 2,635 meters above sea level and falls in a single cropping zone. The main occupation in the area is agriculture.

Location

The Shyok meets the Indus river at Keris about 30 kilometres west of Balghar. The Thallay stream divides Balghar into two parts. The larger part is referred to as Chogo Balghar, and consists of 15 large and small mahallahs; the smaller is called Choo Fuog, consisting of 5 mahallahs. The population of Balghar بلغار is about 20,000.

Balghar is a summer tourist destination. Balghar Ranga is situated in the Gond neighbourhood. It consists of a wide plain. The Sooq and Gond neighbourhoods are in the north and Gamba Burdas are in the south near Thalay valley.

History

The Balghar Polo Ground is the oldest polo ground in this region.

Places to Visit

Sooq Balghar (main point)
Balghr Hashu Broq & Balghr Khoduo Broq 
Balghar Gon Chomik
Balghar Ranga
Bordas Balghar Hydro Station
Hashu  Ol
Chogo Balghar Shahi Polo ground
Skam  Khar
Karfoza Bodtha Age 
Krawathang Sara
Khashu Baho
Youmpawa

Religion

Most Balghar valley residents follow Islam. 77% belong to the Sofia Noorbakhshia sect, 20% to the Ahl-e-Hadith and the remaining 3% of the population belong to other sects of Shia Islam, such as Fiqh Jaffariya.

Occupations

Balghar plays an important role in the Pakistan Army, with many soldiers from the area dying in the 1999 Kargil War. Abdul Qadir Shaheed retrieved Tamgha-e-Jurat in that war. It was said that he was eligible for the Nishan-e-Haider, which is Pakistan's highest military award. Mumtaz Hussain Balghari Shaheed was killed in the war against terrorists on 10 January 2010. Ghazi Muhammad Ali saved a highly targeted post during the war.

Education

An awareness of the importance of education has been prevalent in Balghar for hundreds of years.  From that era, most of them became an Islamic school. After 1945 the few parents sent their children to school. They were 10–14 in number from village Khashu Balghar, Xooq Balghar, and Chogo Balghar. One of them became successful to get his goal. Behind his success was his mother. His mother was not educated but encouraged and helped him to get an education. And he was Syed Muhammad Shah from Chogo Balghar. Then he struggled to spread education in Balghar. Initially, there was no school. And because of his struggle new educational institutions are founded rapidly.

Nowadays there are the following institutions:

 Two model schools
 Five primary schools
 Tent community schools
 Two middle schools
 Non-formal school
 Five BECS schools

Infrastructure

 Fruit nursery (agriculture department)
 Forest nursery (forest department)
 Rashon Depot 
 Hydle (power) station (100KV)
 Hydle station phase I (Bordas Balghar )

Health care

 Five first aid posts 
 A class dispensary
 Veterinary dispensary References (Chogo Balghar)
 B class dispensary yrfog Velleg (Khodakha Balghar)

Natural resources

 10 valleys for pasture
 Abundant water from glaciers (Thalay valley) & Balghar water from two springs (Gon Balghar & Khashu Balghar)
 Two lakes from (Hashuo brog Lagouynangjouing Shagaran Ariyas).

References

Populated places in Ghanche District
Baltistan